, more commonly known as , is a fictional character from the Tekken fighting game franchise by Bandai Namco Entertainment. She was introduced in the 2005 arcade game Tekken 5: Dark Resurrection (an upgrade of Tekken 5) as an affluent teenager whose role in the series involves clashing with her businessman father over her participation in the series' King of Iron Fist fighting tournaments, and her later dealings with Jin Kazama's devious Mishima Zaibatsu corporation. Appearing every subsequent installment, Lili has been used to promote the Tekken games, is featured on official series merchandise, and has made crossover game appearances outside of the franchise. She has received mostly positive critical reception for her gameplay and character design. Lili has a summer version names Summer Lili who's introduced in Tekken Mobile. Summer Lili has the same fighting style and the same Rage Art like Lili.

Appearances

Tekken series
Lili is a Monégasque teenager who is the only child of a pacifistic oil tycoon. At the age of twelve, she had been held for ransom by a group of thugs, but unwittingly took out one of her captors in her attempt to break free. Lili consequently took pleasure in the thrill of defeating her opponents, but her father wants her to grow into a prim and proper lady and not a fighter. She nonetheless steals his private jet to travel abroad and compete in street fighting competitions. This gains the attention of an unknown individual who invites her to compete in the King of Iron Fist tournament, but Lili notices that the tournament organizer, the Mishima Zaibatsu corporation, had caused her father problems in the past. This makes her determined to emerge victorious and put an end to this situation, but she is thwarted by her rival Asuka Kazama, a relative of Mishima Zaibatsu CEO Jin Kazama. Before Lili can attempt to seek revenge, her father learns of her participation and confines her to the family home as punishment. However, the Zaibatsu later annexes her father's oil fields, negatively impacting the business and causing him to suffer anxiety attacks. Lili therefore again defies her father's policy of nonviolence and enters the sixth tournament to take back his property. In Tekken 6's "Scenario Campaign" story mode, Lili attempts to infiltrate the Mishima Zaibatsu and hunt down Jin, but she first has to go through Lars Alexandersson and Alisa Bosconovitch in combat, which she fails. Gracious in defeat, she provides the duo with a new sport utility vehicle that she had previously received as a birthday gift, and makes them guarantee in turn that they will defeat Jin. In Tekken 7, Lili enters the seventh tournament without telling her father for the second time to fight Asuka once again.

Lili appears in the noncanonical games Tekken Tag Tournament 2; the crossover title Street Fighter X Tekken with Asuka as her official tag partner; and the 2013 free-to-play game Tekken Revolution exclusive to the PlayStation 3.

Design and gameplay
GamesRadar's Mikel Reparaz described Lili as a "baby-faced girl who dresses like a pop star." Her primary outfit is a frilly white dress with long sleeves and a red cravat, worn over a short skirt and high-heeled white boots. Her third costume for Tekken 6, a lingerie-themed wedding dress with a length of chain dangling from her left wrist, was designed by manga artist Ito Ōgure. 
Two additional costumes—a bikini and a fluffy skirt—were available as downloadable pre-order bonuses for Tekken Tag Tournament 2. The skirt was created as an experiment in cloth physics using Havok software. For Tekken 7, Lili was given a commemorative outfit modeled after character Miki Hoshii from fellow Bandai Namco franchise The Idolmaster.

Lili's official style is street fighting, combined with gymnastic maneuvers such as flips, cartwheels and handstands. Mike Reilly of Game Revolution said in his 2006 review of Tekken 5: Dark Resurrection that Lili "takes a good deal more practice to master", an issue he opined was offset by the presence of an in-game training mode. Brett Elston of GamesRadar commented on Lili's fighting style in the game: "She doesn't really have a definable combat style, so it's mostly all flash and sexy high kicks ... [but] her quick movements and wide-reaching legs make her ideal for first-timers—those same dance-like attacks also make it hard to get a bead on her next move". According to IGN, Lili's counterattacks, juggles and wall fighting in Tekken 6 are known to cause a lot of damage, but she was "lacking in the low attack department and many of her crush attacks will leave her vulnerable." Mike Harradence of PlayStation Universe wrote in 2012 that Lili's "quirky yet ultimately unique style provides ample opportunity for juggles and she can mix it up with the best of them thanks to an arrange of low-mid attacks." Tom Goulter of GamesRadar said of the character in Tekken Tag Tournament 2: "Lili is one of the series' less fleet-footed characters, with a gymnastic-influenced style that favors precision over quickness."

Other video games and media
Outside of the Tekken series, Lili is selectable in the roleplaying games Queen's Gate: Spiral Chaos and Digimon World Re:Digitize, the latter as a guest character who uses her trained Numemon, Monzaemon and Lillithmon to fight other players. She is additionally the central character of Queen's Gate Lili, part of the Japan-exclusive Queen's Gate gamebook series.

Promotion and merchandise

Lili was among many Tekken female characters portrayed by models for a 2006 Maxim photoshoot. A live-action trailer from the 2011 Spike Video Game Awards that promoted the console versions of Tekken Tag Tournament 2 showed Lili, Asuka Kazama, Kazuya Mishima and Bryan Fury in a four-way battle, though their faces were silhouetted. Model-actress Corissa Furr played Lili in a Tekken Tag Tournament 2 "Girl Power" trailer that was shown at Comic-Con in 2012, and appeared at the event dressed as the character.

A render of Lili in a bikini was featured on the cover of Play magazine's 2009 Girls of Gaming Vol. 7 issue. A wall poster was released to promote her Street Fighter X Tekken appearance. In 2009, two Lili action figures were manufactured by Super Modelling Soul and released by Bandai as part of their Tekken 6 toyline. In 2011, Hobby Japan released a Lili figure based on her Queen's Gate appearances. As part of the Tekken Tag Tournament 2 line, Kotobukiya released a Lili bishōjo figurine in February 2013 that was based on an illustration by former Square Enix character designer Shunya Yamashita.

Reception
The character has received mostly positive critical reception. IGN's Andrew Alfonso described Lili as a "deadly Lolita-looking warrior". Luke van Leuveren of PALGN opined that Lili and the other new characters who debuted in Dark Resurrection "fit well into the game and don’t feel tacked on." James Mielke of 1UP.com, in 2007, deemed Lili "the most substantial new character the series has seen in years". NowGamer described Lili as "an instant hit" for her "flowery girly-girl appearance" and "light-footed fighting style", because, the site wrote, "she’s a girl and girls love that kind of stuff." Brian Soboleski of TeamXbox included Lili among the site's eleven "hotties in the Xbox universe" for "her role of a childish, yet seductive, fighter whose self confidence made her even more appealing." She was listed as the ninth-"sexiest female video game character of all time" by Albert Costill of AMOG in 2013: "She’s a cute, blonde bombshell that blends street fighting with gymnastics. It doesn’t get any better than that." Kevin Wong of Complex listed her as the fifteenth-best Tekken character in 2013: "If a player wants to kick ass and look impeccable doing it, Lili is the girl for the job." Jayson Dubin of GameZone criticized Lili's "faux originality" in his 2006 review of Dark Resurrection: "She's a decent character that offers a lot of moves to learn. But when I control her, I don't feel like I'm in the next evolution of Tekken. I feel like I'm charge of a rehash." Tom Goulter of GamesRadar said in 2012, "[It's] nice to see that someone finally found a way to work a character with daddy issues into the Tekken series," but Writtin King of Game Informer included Lili in his 2012 ranking of the most "ridiculous" Tekken characters on the basis of her primary costume. "[We're] supposed to believe Lili is proficient in street fighting? Give me a break." King additionally commented on her storyline of being housebound by her father for fighting in the tournament: "In other words, she got grounded. I wonder if she lost her telephone privileges, too." In an official fan poll hosted by Namco in 2012, Lili was the second most-requested Tekken character for inclusion in Tekken X Street Fighter with 16.72% (14,764) of 88,280 votes.

Writer Dai Sato expressed interest in doing a Tekken film starring Asuka and Lili as main characters

References

Female characters in video games
Fictional gymnasts
Fictional Monegasque people
Fictional socialites
Teenage characters in video games
Tekken characters
Woman soldier and warrior characters in video games
Video game characters introduced in 2005